The 2009–10 Ugandan Big League is the 1st season of the official second tier Ugandan football championship.

Overview
The 2009–10 Uganda Big League was contested by 16 teams divided into two groups. The Elgon Group was won by Gulu United FC and the Rwenzori Group was won by Maroons FC.  The third promotion place went to UTODA FC who won the promotion play-off.

Clubs within the Big League enter the Ugandan Cup and Gulu United FC progressed as far as the Quarter Finals where they were defeated 3-0 away to Masaka LC .

Participants and locations
The 16 clubs that competed in the first season of the FBL in 2009-10 were as follows:

League standings

Elgon Group

Rwenzori Group

Promotion playoff

Final

Championship playoff

Final

Footnotes

External links
 Uganda - List of Champions - RSSSF (Hans Schöggl)
 Ugandan Football League Tables - League321.com

Ugandan Big League seasons
Uganda
2009–10 in Ugandan football